"Nice to Know You" is the first track and second single by Incubus from their fourth studio album, Morning View (2001). Released on December 4, 2001, it peaked at number nine on the US Billboard Modern Rock Tracks and Mainstream Rock charts and at number five on the Bubbling Under Hot 100.

Music video 
The video, directed by Jeb Brien, features the band performing the song at the Bakersfield Convention Center on January 3, 2002, with opening acts Audiovent and Hoobastank.

Track listing 
 "Nice to Know You"
 "Glass" (Live)
 "Just a Phase" (Live)
 "Nice to Know You" (Live)

Charts

References

External links 
 

2001 singles
2001 songs
Epic Records singles
Immortal Records singles
Incubus (band) songs
Song recordings produced by Scott Litt
Songs written by Alex Katunich
Songs written by Brandon Boyd
Songs written by Chris Kilmore
Songs written by José Pasillas
Songs written by Mike Einziger